Mitsunari is a Japanese name that may refer to:

 Ishida Mitsunari (1559–1600), Japanese samurai and military commander
 Mitsunari Musaka (born 1991), Japanese footballer
 Mitsunari Okamoto (born 1965), Japanese politician
 Mitsunari Kanai (1939–2004), Japanese aikido and iaido teacher

See also
 Mitsunori

Japanese masculine given names
Japanese-language surnames